The unfinished obelisk is the largest known ancient obelisk and is located in the northern region of the stone quarries of ancient Egypt in Aswan, Egypt. It was studied in detail by Reginald Engelbach in 1922.

The obelisk and wider quarry were inscribed on the UNESCO World Heritage List in 1979 along with other examples of Upper Egyptian architecture, as part of the "Nubian Monuments from Abu Simbel to Philae" (despite the quarry site being neither Nubian, nor between Abu Simbel and Philae).

History of the obelisk
Its creation was ordered by Hatshepsut (1508–1458 BC), possibly to complement what would later be known as the Lateran Obelisk (which was originally at Karnak, and was later brought to the Lateran Palace in Rome). The unfinished obelisk is nearly one-third larger than any ancient Egyptian obelisk ever erected.

The obelisk's creators began to carve it directly out of bedrock, but cracks appeared in the granite and the project was abandoned. The bottom side of the obelisk is still attached to the bedrock. 

The unfinished obelisk offers unusual insights into ancient Egyptian stone-working techniques, with marks from workers' tools still clearly visible as well as ochre-colored lines marking where they were working.

Besides the unfinished obelisk, an unfinished, partly worked obelisk base was discovered in 2005 at the quarries of Aswan. Also discovered were some rock carvings and remains that may correspond to the site where most of the famous obelisks were worked. All these quarries in Aswan and the unfinished objects are an open-air museum and are officially protected by the Egyptian government as an archeological site.

Gallery

See also
 List of colossal sculpture in situ
 List of Egyptian obelisks
 List of largest monoliths in the world

References

External links
Unfinished Obelisk in situ
Aerial photograph of the unfinished obelisk, at the quarry area

Archaeological sites in Egypt
Ancient Egyptian obelisks
Open-air museums in Egypt
Aswan
Unfinished sculptures